Rear Admiral Vineet McCarty is a serving Flag officer in the Indian Navy. He currently serves as the Flag Officer Commanding Western Fleet. He earlier served as India's Defence adviser at the Republic of Singapore with concurrent accreditation to the Philippines.

Naval career
McCarty was commissioned into the Indian Navy on 1 July 1989. He is a specialist in gunnery. He was a part of the commissioning crew of the lead ship of her class of guided missile destroyers . He later served as the gunnery officer of the ship. McCarty has served as the executive officer of a seaward defence patrol vessel and a guided missile vessel.

In his staff appointments, McCarty has served as the Command Plans officer at Headquarters Eastern Naval Command and as the Commodore (Naval Plans) at naval headquarters. He has served as the Training Commander at the Indian Naval Academy when it was based at Goa. He has also served as the directing staff at the Naval and Maritime Academy, Trincomalee, the naval academy of the Sri Lankan Navy.

McCarty has commanded the Anti-submarine warfare patrol vessel – the Abhay-class corvette . He subsequently commanded the Khukri-class guided-missile corvette . He then served as the executive officer of the only Amphibious transport dock of the Navy  and commanded the lead ship of her class of stealth guided missile frigate .

As a Captain, McCarty served as the defence adviser to the High Commissioner of India to the Republic of Singapore. During this tenure, he had concurrent accreditation to the Republic of the Philippines. He is an alumnus of the Defence Services Staff College, Wellington and the National Defence College, New Delhi.

Flag rank
McCarty was promoted to flag rank in February 2020 and was appointed Assistant Chief of Naval Staff (Staff Requirements) (ACNS SR) at naval headquarters. 
He took command of the Western Fleet on 15 November 2022 as the Flag Officer Commanding Western Fleet from Rear Admiral Sameer Saxena.

Awards and decorations

See also
 Flag Officer Commanding Western Fleet
 Western Fleet

References 

Indian Navy admirals
Living people
Flag Officers Commanding Western Fleet
Year of birth missing (living people)
Indian naval attachés
National Defence College, India alumni
Defence Services Staff College alumni